Confederation Trough EP is the EP debut for Richard D. James's alias, The Tuss. 
Although Richard made the project, it was credited to faux name Brian Tregaskin. 
The release contains a mix of techno and acid, and would be followed up by Rushup Edge only a couple months later in June.

When the song "Alspacka" is viewed with CD-Text, the name "RUSHUP" appears, suggesting that it might have been intended to be released on Rushup Edge.

Track listing

Format Exclusive Tracks

The CD and 12" vinyl releases have different closing tracks. The CD release has "GX1 Solo", while the record has "Akunk."

CD Release

Vinyl Release

Side A plays at 45 rpm, while Side B plays at 33  rpm.

References

CD entry at discogs.com
12" vinyl entry at discogs.com

2007 debut EPs
Electronic EPs
Rephlex Records EPs